Defending champion Stefan Edberg defeated Pete Sampras in the final, 3–6, 6–4, 7–6(7–5), 6–2 to win the men's singles tennis title at the 1992 US Open.

The semifinal match between Edberg and Michael Chang lasted 5 hours and 26 minutes, making it the longest match in the Open Era up to that point.

This tournament marked the last appearance in a major for both John McEnroe and Jimmy Connors. McEnroe lost to Jim Courier in the fourth round, while Connors lost to Ivan Lendl in the second round.

Seeds
The seeded players are listed below. Stefan Edberg is the champion; others show the round in which they were eliminated.

  Jim Courier (semifinalist)
  Stefan Edberg (champion)
  Pete Sampras (finalist)
  Michael Chang (semifinalist)
  Goran Ivanišević (third round)
  Petr Korda (first round)
  Boris Becker (fourth round)
  Andre Agassi (quarterfinalist)
  Ivan Lendl (quarterfinalist)
  Carlos Costa (fourth round)
  Michael Stich (second round)
  Wayne Ferreira (quarterfinalist)
  Guy Forget (fourth round)
  MaliVai Washington (fourth round)
  Richard Krajicek (fourth round)
  John McEnroe (fourth round)

Qualifying

Draw

Key
 Q = Qualifier
 WC = Wild card
 LL = Lucky loser
 r = Retired

Final eight

Section 1

Section 2

Section 3

Section 4

Section 5

Section 6

Section 7

Section 8

External links
 Association of Tennis Professionals (ATP) – 1992 US Open Men's Singles draw
1992 US Open – Men's draws and results at the International Tennis Federation

Men's singlesMen's singles
US Open (tennis) by year – Men's singles